Aalborg Air Base also Air Transport Wing Aalborg is a military air base for the Royal Danish Air Force . It is located at Vadum, near Aalborg, Denmark.
Aalborg Air Base shares its runway system as well as some services (Air Traffic Control etc.) with Aalborg Lufthavn.

Residing Royal Danish Air Force units are:
 721 Squadron which is an air transport squadron equipped with four Lockheed C-130J-30 Hercules and three CL-604 Challenger aircraft

It is also the base for Denmark's elite Jægerkorpset special forces unit.

Until their decommissioning on 10 January 2006, Aalborg Air Base was also home to:
 723 Squadron
 726 Squadron
These two squadrons were reconnaissance and fighter squadrons equipped with Lockheed F-16MLU Fighting Falcon aircraft.
The aircraft from these squadrons were transferred to Skrydstrup Air Base instead.

History 
Aalborg Air Base was established along with Aalborg Airport in 1938, serving the first Danish domestic flight between Aalborg and Copenhagen. The air base was established following pressure from the Aalborg Portland cement factory as local authorities were hesitant to invest in air traffic infrastructure.

When Germany invaded Denmark on 9 April 1940, the German Luftwaffe (Air Force) launched one of the first airborne operations in history, in which paratroopers captured the airport. Aalborg Lufthavn was considered a crucial element in the ferrying of troops and equipment from Germany to Norway as it acted as a refuelling base for Luftwaffe transport planes, especially Junkers Ju 52/3m, during the campaign.

A well known air battle took place over the airport on 13 August 1940, when a squadron of Royal Air Force Bristol Blenheim bombers attacked the German aircraft based there. All eleven attacking aircraft were shot down by either German anti-aircraft fire or Messerschmitt Bf 109 fighter aircraft.

The Luftwaffe greatly expanded the airport - which they called Fliegerhorst Aalborg West - from 140 to 2750 hectares of land.

On June 16, 1944, RAF de Havilland Mosquitoes attacked the airfield. One of the RAF pilots, New Zealand fighter ace Michael Herrick, was killed leading aircraft of No. 305 Polish Bomber Squadron.  His earlier service had included flying night fighters in the Battle of Britain and two operational tours flying Curtiss P-40 Kittyhawks in the Pacific before returning to Britain to fly Mosquitoes against the Luftwaffe.

After the war, an internment camp for Baltic German refugees was set up at the location.

When the Royal Air Force arrived at the airport in 1945 most military and airport equipment had been destroyed. At this time the airport is by far the largest in Denmark.

When the Royal Danish Air Force was created in 1950, it took over the Fliegerhorst.

See also
 List of the largest airports in the Nordic countries

References

Airports in Denmark
Royal Danish Air Force
History of Aalborg
Transport in Aalborg
Buildings and structures in Aalborg
Military installations of Denmark